Bounlap Keokangna is a heritage conservationist architect from Laos. On 9 March 2018, Keokangna was conferred the Padma Sri for his contribution in the field of architecture by the President of India, Ram Nath Kovind.

References 

Laotian architects
Year of birth missing (living people)
Living people
Recipients of the Padma Shri